Rachel Barrell (born 1980) is a British stage performer and singer known best for playing Christine, the female lead in the West End production of The Phantom of the Opera, from September 2004 until October 2006. She played the role for some time opposite London's longest running Phantom, John Owen-Jones, and was the Christine in his last performance. She also performed for the show's 18th and 20th anniversaries.

In February 2007 she played young Sally in a special charity performance of Follies. Rachel has also previously performed in the musicals Thoroughly Modern Millie and Beauty and the Beast. She also runs a dance school in Hertfordshire.

She currently runs a youth theatre company in Hertfordshire called “spotlight”, along with her husband.

References

External links 
 Unofficial fansite
 [ Bio page on the official Phantom of the Opera website]

Living people
Alumni of the Guildford School of Acting
British stage actresses
British women singers
1980 births
21st-century British women singers